Ronnie Hickman (born October 11, 2001) is an American football safety. He played college football at Ohio State.

Early life and high school career
Raised in South Orange, New Jersey, Hickman attended DePaul Catholic High School in Wayne, New Jersey. He played safety and wide receiver in high school. Hickman was selected to play in the 2019 All-American Bowl. He committed to Ohio State University to play college football.

College career
Hickman played at Ohio State from 2019 to 2022. After redshirting in 2019 to recover from an injury he suffered his senior year in high school, he played in five games in 2020 on special teams, finishing with five tackles. In 2021, he started all 13 games recording 99 tackles, two interceptions, a sack and a touchdown. In 2022, he started 13 games and had 53 tackles and an interception. After the season, Hickman entered the 2023 NFL draft.

References

External links
Ohio State Buckeyes bio

Living people
DePaul Catholic High School alumni
Players of American football from New Jersey
American football safeties
Ohio State Buckeyes football players
People from South Orange, New Jersey
Sportspeople from Essex County, New Jersey
Year of birth missing (living people)